Gordon Victor Brooks (30 May 1938 – 31 January 2004) was an Australian cricketer who played 26 matches for South Australia between 1961 and 1964.

See also 
 List of cricketers called for throwing in top-class cricket matches in Australia

External links 

1938 births
2004 deaths
South Australia cricketers
Australian cricketers
Cricketers from South Australia
People from Ceduna, South Australia